Ken Flach and Robert Seguso were the defending champions but lost in the quarterfinals to Jeremy Bates and Kevin Curren.

Jakob Hlasek and John McEnroe won in the final 6–1, 7–6 against Bates and Curren.

Seeds
Champion seeds are indicated in bold text while text in italics indicates the round in which those seeds were eliminated.

 Ken Flach /  Robert Seguso (quarterfinals)
 Jakob Hlasek /  John McEnroe (champions)
 Pieter Aldrich /  Danie Visser (semifinals)
 Darren Cahill /  John Fitzgerald (semifinals)

Draw

External links
 1989 Benson & Hedges Championships Doubles Draw

Wembley Championships
1989 Grand Prix (tennis)